Patel Joitabhai Kasnabhai is an Indian politician. He is a Former Member of the Gujarat Legislative Assembly from the Dhanera Assembly constituency since 2012 to 2017. He is associated with the Indian National Congress.

References 

Indian National Congress politicians from Gujarat
Gujarat MLAs 2012–2017
Year of birth missing (living people)
Living people
Place of birth missing (living people)
Gujarat MLAs 1980–1985
Gujarat MLAs 1985–1990